The Vigilant Eagle Airport Protection System is a proposed directed-energy weapon under  development by the U.S. military under a Defense Department contract with Raytheon. It would create an invisible microwave dome around an airport that could block missiles heading toward incoming and outgoing aircraft.

Man-portable air-defense systems (MANPADS) are shoulder-launched surface-to-air missiles (SAMs) that present a tremendous threat to both civilian and military aircraft. It is estimated 700,000 MANPADs have been built and sold across the world, thousands of which are unaccounted for and sold daily on the black market. The U.S. government says these type of weapons have been used in at least 36 attacks on civilian aircraft in the past three decades.

A successful attack of this kind would cause more than loss of life. The estimated cost of a four-hour operational shut down of an airport is $40 million. This would have an estimated $10 billion impact on the U.S. economy and an estimated $300 billion impact globally.

History 
Raytheon's experimentation with directed energy weapons began when its research labs' experiments had inadvertently produced the first microwave oven in 1958. Under William Swanson, Raytheon’s chairman and CEO, the company has become even more focused on directed energy systems. He has stated "When I look at directed energy, it's clear that if someone is gonna put us out of business, it will be us."

Raytheon Missile Systems developed Vigilant Eagle under a U.S. Defense Department contract and has discussed with the Department of Homeland Security, the potential of using it at U.S. airports. In 2006, a $4.1 million contract with the Department of Homeland Security was issued to assess the anti-missile system.

Within the last three years, the company's researchers have shot down multiple types of shoulder-fired antiaircraft missiles at a distance of several miles with pulses of microwave energy. The company says that its prototype high-power microwave (HPM) weapon, with an energy focused to within 1 degree, sends an electrical pulse which penetrates through openings in the missile’s metal parts and reaches its computers and guidance system. This energy is powerful enough to damage electrical components and scramble computer chips, causing the missile to fly off course. Raytheon has tested the system at an American airport, but both the company and the airport are unwilling to disclose which one because of a confidentiality agreement.

Effects 

The VE works by directing electromagnetic radiation; specifically, a set of high-frequency microwaves toward any projectile fired at an aircraft that is either taking off or landing. For example, if someone were to launch a shoulder-fired projectile or missile from outside the airport during an aircraft's takeoff, the VE airfield would detect the missile's presence and would shoot a microwave beam to deflect it from the airfield.

Vigilant Eagle consists of three major components: a missile detecting and tracking subsystem (MDT), a command and control system, and a scanning array. The MDT is a fixed grid of passive infrared (IR) cameras. The command and control system determines where the launch of the projectile is taking place. Using the scanning array, it can interfere with the MANPAD's guidance system and deflect it away from the aircraft.

Advantages and disadvantages 
The first large difference between the ground-based Vigilant Eagle and other aircraft protection systems is the lower cost between it and its rivals. Mike Booen, Raytheon’s chief of directed-energy programs estimates that the system can be built for about $25 million per airport if the system is deployed in at least 25 airports. Of all the airports located within the U.S., the top 31 airports account for 70% of the country’s takeoffs and landings. "If Vigilant Eagle is installed in all of them, the expenditure would total less than $1 billion, compared with the $6–$12 billion it would take to install protection systems on 6,000 aircraft".

Airline carriers have also stated concerns with airplane-mounted systems because of the weight and cost of these systems. The DHS has stated that the cost of each flight carrying the countermeasure would be approximately $350. During the airlines’ best year ever, they only earned about $600 per flight. It is also unclear whether the airlines or the government would bear the cost of using these types of systems.

The biggest challenges in implementing this new system is whether the private and public sectors can be convinced the new technology is worth the expensive price and difficult logistics. A government-accountability report from April 2009 cited several the problems facing the Defense Department's non-lethal weapons program. This report used another of Raytheon's non-lethal weapons systems, the Active Denial System, as an example. One of the problems discussed was that the systems' components were "too complex".

Critics of the program have also stated that the diameter of protection provided by the system is inadequate to thwart all threats imposed by MANPADS. The University of Southern California reported in a study funded by the Federal Emergency Management Agency that “the capability of MANPADS to reach targets at altitudes of up to or beyond 15,000 feet allow these weapons to be used at a radius of 50 miles or more from most airports, making perimeter facility control largely ineffective.” Northrop Grumman has also estimated that "the zone of vulnerability around the airport is 300 square miles." This would mean that the system would need to utilize a  perimeter around the airport that is believed to be “unrealistic.”

See also
 Area denial weapon, to prevent an adversary from occupying or traversing an area
 Directed-energy weapons
 Long Range Acoustic Device
 Missile defense
 Radiation

References 

Non-lethal weapons
Counterterrorism in the United States
Directed-energy weapon of the United States
Missile defense
Raytheon Company products